Escape Plan: The Extractors is a 2019 American direct-to-video prison action thriller film directed and co-written by John Herzfeld, and a sequel to Escape Plan (2013) and Escape Plan 2: Hades (2018). It is the third and final installment in the Escape Plan film series. The film features Sylvester Stallone, 50 Cent, Dave Bautista and Jaime King reprising their roles from the previous films with Max Zhang, Harry Shum, Jr., Malese Jow and Devon Sawa joining the cast. The film was released straight-to-DVD in the United States on July 2, 2019, but received theatrical releases in such countries as Russia, Italy, Australia, Turkey and Portugal.

Escape Plan: The Extractors received negative reviews, though they were an improvement over the previous film's reception. With a smaller production budget of $3.6 million, it grossed $1.8 million theatrically in some countries and was successful in the home market, having domestically grossed $2.9 million.

Plot
After touring factory locations in Mansfield, Ohio for her father's company, Hong Kong-based Zhang Innovations, Daya Zhang and her entourage are abducted by mercenaries despite her bodyguard and head of security Bao Yung attempting to fight them off. The kidnappers leave Yung unconscious with a USB flash drive addressed to security expert Ray Breslin.

In Los Angeles, Breslin crosses paths with Shen Lo, a former Zhang Innovations bodyguard. Both men are after Daya's father Wu Zhang, whose company is responsible for building covert prisons around the world. They meet with Breslin's associates – his girlfriend Abigail, Hush, and Jules – when Yung arrives with the flash drive. It contains a video message from Lester Clark, Jr., Daya's kidnapper and the son of Breslin's former partner; in business with Zhang, Lester, Sr. betrayed Breslin and was sent to his death.

Breslin reaches out to Trent DeRosa, an associate, and they trace the video to a prison compound in Latvia known as “Devil's Station”. Abigail is also abducted, and Wu, having arrived in Mansfield to meet with police, receives a video call from Lester. Seeking revenge for his father's downfall, Lester demands a $700 million ransom, and executes a hostage. Breslin, DeRosa, Jules, Shen, and Yung depart for Latvia to rescue Daya and Abigail.

When Lester threatens the prisoners and kills a hostage, Wong, Zhang Innovations' technology analyst, agrees to give him access to Zhang's technology. Hush surveils the prison by drone, and its thermal imaging camera reveals Lester has created his own black site. Breslin infiltrates the compound through the sewers while Shen and Yung approach the outer walls. Alerted to their presence, Lester leaves Daya atop the wall as bait. Realizing Lester is leading them to a trap, Shen tries to hold position and wait for Breslin, but Yung charges recklessly ahead, and he and Shen are subdued by land mines and captured. Lester reveals the flash drive was a tracker that led his men to Abigail, and deduces that Shen and Daya are in love. He shoots Yung and taunts Breslin by video call before cutting Abigail's throat.

Breslin proceeds through the compound, killing several of Lester's henchmen. Shen steals a guard's stun gun as he is taken to the cells, using it to start a fire; he melts his restraints and subdues the guards in the smoke. He frees Daya, but they are confronted by more guards. DeRosa arrives, killing the guards with incendiary rounds. In the ensuing chaos, Shen kills Lester's remaining henchman Silva in a hand-to-hand fight, while rescuing Wong. Trapped in a shootout with Lester in the upper cells, Breslin is wounded and disarmed, but manages to overpower Lester before slitting his throat and throwing him off the walkway, avenging Abigail.

Returning to Mansfield, Daya coldly greets her father, now aware of the true nature of his business, before leaving with Shen. DeRosa comforts Breslin over Abigail's death, urging him to forgive himself, while at the same time perusing Breslin to join him in South America; claiming that Breslin owes him one and Breslin decides to retire.

During the ending credits, Yung is revealed to have survived but heavily wounded. He is seen crawling and stumbling through the sewers and proceeds to escape by himself.

A second person seen wearing security overalls, carrying a semi automatic weapon
drops through a central shaft from the ceiling into the tunnel sewers, just moments after Yung had already been seen arriving into that same Tunnel from a side shaft seemingly stalking Yung.

Cast

Vincent D'Onofrio also appears as Lester Clark in archive footage from Escape Plan.

Production
Development was first announced in April 2017, when Stallone said while filming Escape Plan 2: Hades that a third installment in this franchise was on its way. In August 2017, casting was underway for extras and speaking roles. The producers aimed for actors with MMA experience, as there would be potential fight scenes with Stallone and Bautista. Filming began on September 18, 2017, and wrapped on October 13, 2017. The film was originally titled Escape Plan 3: Devil's Station, but by October 2018 the title had been changed to Escape Plan: The Extractors.

Reception

Critical response

Noel Murray of the Los Angeles Times said that "while this film is better than its predecessor" it lacks the spark of the original and "is, ultimately, just another VOD actioner."

Brian Orndorf of Blu-ray.com gave it B− grade and wrote: "Herzfeld provides pleasingly mean energy, stuffing the effort with violence and anger, even managing to pull off something that's eluded the series up to this point: genuine surprise."

References

External links
 Official website
 
 
 

2019 films
American sequel films
American films about revenge
American action thriller films
American prison films
2019 action thriller films
2010s prison films
Films directed by John Herzfeld
Films set in Belarus
Films set in Estonia
Films set in Hong Kong
Films set in Latvia
Films set in Los Angeles
Films set in Ohio
Films about prison escapes
Films produced by Zack Schiller
2010s American films